Luis Santana may refer to:

 Luis Santana (sport shooter) (born 1937), Dominican sport shooter
 Luis Santana (boxer) (born 1958), Dominican boxer
 Luis Santana (footballer) (born 1991), Ecuadorian footballer